The 27th Legislative Assembly of British Columbia sat from 1964 to 1966. The members were elected in the British Columbia general election held in September 1963. The Social Credit Party led by W. A. C. Bennett formed the government. The New Democratic Party (NDP) led by Robert Strachan formed the official opposition.

William Harvey Murray served as speaker for the assembly.

Members of the 27th General Assembly 
The following members were elected to the assembly in 1963:

Notes:

Party standings

By-elections 
None.

Other changes 
North Okanagan (dec. George William McLeod December 1965)

References 

Political history of British Columbia
Terms of British Columbia Parliaments
1964 establishments in British Columbia
1966 disestablishments in British Columbia
20th century in British Columbia